Alimi Adewale (born May 8, 1974) is a Nigerian contemporary visual artist and painter.  but his interest in art and exhibitions spurred his interest in becoming an artist. His works explore topical urban issues, documentation of everyday city people and the controversial subject of ‘Nudes in African Art’ as a form of expression.

See also 
 Nengi Omuku
 Stella Fakiyesi

References

Nigerian painters
Yoruba people
1974 births
Living people
Contemporary painters
University of Ilorin alumni